Dorrit is a feminine given name. Persons bearing the name include:

 Amy Dorrit, known as "Little Dorrit", the heroine of Charles Dickens' novel of the same name (1855-7)
 As an English surname, Dorrit may be a variant of the surname Durward, or a matronymic derived from the given name Dorothy.
 Dorrit Black (1891–1951), Australian artist
 Dorrit Dekk (1917–2014), Czech-British artist
Dorrit Hoffleit (1907–2007), American astronomer
Dorrit Jacob, German-Australian geochemist
 Dorrit Kristensen (born 1938), Danish swimmer
 Dorrit Moussaieff (born 1950), First Lady of Iceland
 Dorrit Reventlow (born 1942), Danish translator, benefactor, philanthropist, social activist, and widow of Prince Dimitri Romanov
 Dorrit Weixler (1892–1916), German actress
 Dorrit Willumsen (born 1940), Danish writer

See also
Dorit (disambiguation)

Feminine given names
Danish feminine given names
Jewish feminine given names